Atcher is a surname. Notable people with the surname include:

Bob Atcher (1914–1993), American musician
Randy Atcher (1918–2002), American musician